The Venezuelan Women's Super League is the top level league competition for women's football in Venezuela. The winner qualifies for the Copa Libertadores de Fútbol Femenino, the South American Champions League. The competition is organised by the Venezuelan Football Federation. It was established in 2017, with the league was made into a semi-professional one, and under the control of the Women's Football Commission.

History
A national amateur league was formed in 2000. In the Liga Amateur de Fútbol Femenino (LAFF) mostly University teams were playing. UCAB (Universidad Católica Andrés Bello) from Caracas won three of the four editions. In 2003/04 the national league was established. It was called the Primera División Femenina until 2016, when it was decided that women's footballers will be received with more adequate means to improve their football life, thus leading to the creation of the Super League in 2017. The newly established Super League will allow clubs to have professional contracts for female footballers and greater insurance, though it is not mandatory due to its semi-professional status.

Format 
In the 2011 season there were 11 teams in two divisions, an Eastern and Western one. The champion qualified for the Copa Libertadores.
The 2012/13 season was played in Apertura and Clausura format. Apertura from September to December and Clausura from December to June.

In 2016 the final stage consisted of a hexagonal with six teams each playing each other twice. The two leading teams played for the championship in a two leg match.

In 2017 the national FA changed the league to a semi-professional one. Clubs now need a license, professional staff and pay their players.

List of champions 
Below is the list of champions. Caracas FC have been national champion five times, the most of any team.

Liga Amateur de Fútbol Femenino
1999 Estudiantes de Mérida
2000 UCAB (Universidad Católica Andrés Bello)
2001 UCAB
2003 UCAB

Liga Nacional Femenina

Superliga Femenina

References

External links 
Venezuelan FA
Twitter-Feed

women
Venezuela
Women's sports leagues in Venezuela